Lev Nikolayevich Korolyov (also Korolev, ; 6 September 1926 – 5 January 2016) was a Russian / Soviet computer scientist,   a corresponding member of the USSR Academy of Sciences. He was involved in the development of  the first Soviet computers.

Biography 
Korolev was born in Podolsk, Russia.  After Army service, he graduated from  Faculty of Mechanics and Mathematics, Moscow State University in 1952.  In 1953-1975 Korolev worked at the Institute of Precise Mechanics and Computer Engineering of academician S.A. Lebedev, and became his deputy.  He died in Moscow in 2016 at the age of 89.

Professional career
He worked on the development of  software for  the BESM built in 1953, the first large Russian computer, and its subsequent models

In 1956 Korolev created one of the first programs for the BESM for machine translation of written text from English into Russian. In 1960 he was awarded the degree "Kandidat in Physical and Mathematical Sciences" for a thesis on the theory of machine translation.

He headed the team which wrote control software for ballistic missile defense, using the computers M-40 and M-50. For this research, Korolev was awarded doctorate in 1967.
His team produced the first operating system for BESM-6, a batch processing system later named "Dispatcher-68".
 
In 1981 Korolev was elected a corresponding member of the USSR Academy of Sciences at the Department of Mathematics.

Korolev has held a chair at the Moscow State University Department of Computational Mathematics and Cybernetics since its founding in 1970.

Korolev wrote over 80 scientific publications, including   10 monographs and textbooks. Two of them, Structures of Electronic Computers and their mathematical basis, Moscow, ‘Nauka', 1974 (2nd ed., 1978) and Microprocessors, micro- and mini-computer, Moscow, ‘Nauka', 1984 are the most significant. Among his students are two academicians of the Russian Academy of Sciences and over 40 scientists with "Doktor Nauk" and Kandidat Nauk degrees. In 1997 L .N. Korolev was awarded "Honorable professorship of the MSU".
Korolev received the USSR State Prize (1969), the Prize of the USSR Council of Ministers (1982), the Lomonosov Prize of the MSU (1995).   and the  Order of Lenin,  Order of the October Revolution, and Order of the Patriotic War.

References

External links 
Biography of L. N. Korolev  at Virtual Museum Computer.
 Lev Korolyov — scientific works on the website Math-Net.Ru

1926 births
2016 deaths
Russian computer scientists
Russian inventors
Soviet computer scientists
Recipients of the USSR State Prize
Corresponding Members of the Russian Academy of Sciences
Recipients of the Order of Lenin
People from Podolsk